Sant Gadge Maharaj Chowk, is a monorail station and the southernmost terminus of the Mumbai Monorail, serving the area of Mahalaxmi and Byculla in South Mumbai. It was inaugurated on 3 March 2019 by Piyush Goyal the then,Railway Minister and Devendra Fadnavis the then Chief Minister of Maharashtra.

The station is located in the Vicinity of Arthur Road Jail, it is in close proximity to Mahalaxmi railway station, Chinchpokli railway station and Byculla railway station, Mahalaxmi Racecourse. The Dagdi Chawl can be accessed through this station. St. Ignatius High School is the only school located in its vicinity along with Kasturbha Gandhi Hospital. It also gives connectivity to Haji Ali Dargah and Worli, Lala Lajpat Rai College, Hira Panna, NH.SRCC Hospital.

References

Mumbai Monorail stations